Vincenzo Vallelonga is a Paralympic athletics competitor from Australia. At the 1988 Summer Paralympics he won four medals: silver in the Men's 4 × 100 m Relay 1A–1C, silver in the Men's 100 m 1B, bronze in the Men's 4 × 200 m Relay 1A–1C and bronze in the Men's Slalom 1B. At the 1992 Barcelona Games he won a bronze medal in the Men's 4 × 400 m Relay TW1-2 event and a silver medal in the Men's 4 × 100 m Relay TW1-2 event.

References

Paralympic athletes of Australia
Athletes (track and field) at the 1992 Summer Paralympics
Paralympic silver medalists for Australia
Paralympic bronze medalists for Australia
Living people
Medalists at the 1988 Summer Paralympics
Medalists at the 1992 Summer Paralympics
Year of birth missing (living people)
Paralympic medalists in athletics (track and field)
Australian male wheelchair racers
Athletes (track and field) at the 1988 Summer Paralympics